Chantel Ellen Malone (born 2 December 1991 in Puerto Rico) is an athlete representing the British Virgin Islands who competes in the long jump and sprinting events.

Malone attended Althea Scatiffe Primary School before attending BVI High School, which Is now known as Elmore Stoutt High School.

In college, she was the Conference Champion for both indoor and outdoor track and field events, named All-American at the NCAA Division 1 Championship, and was a finalist at the World Junior Championships in two events, the long jump and the 400. She placed fourth at the Commonwealth Games, won gold at the CAC Championships, and most recently won a silver medal at the NACAC Championships.

In August 2015, Malone joined with Digicel as a brand ambassador. She will act as a spokesperson for the brand with a special focus on youth and sports throughout the British Virgin Islands and be featured in Digicel's advertising campaign, highlighting the territory's most reliable 4G network.

At the 2019 Pan American Games, Malone became the first athlete to win a medal for the British Virgin Islands in the history of the Pan American Games, winning the gold medal at the long jump event.

She represented the British Virgin Islands at the 2020 Summer Olympics.

Competition record

Personal bests
Outdoor
200 metres – 23.37 (+0.1 m/s) (Houston 2011)
400 metres – 52.35 (Austin 2010) NR
High jump – 1.65 (Tortola 2008)
Long jump – 7.08 (+1.4) (Miramar 2021) NR
Triple jump – 13.27 (+1.6 (Des Moines 2011) NR
Indoor
400 metres – 53.23 (Albuquerque 2011) NR
Long jump – 6.67 (Berlin 2017) NR
Triple jump – 13.45 (College Station 2011) NR

References

External links

1991 births
Living people
British Virgin Islands long jumpers
British Virgin Islands female sprinters
Commonwealth Games competitors for the British Virgin Islands
Athletes (track and field) at the 2014 Commonwealth Games
Athletes (track and field) at the 2018 Commonwealth Games
Athletes (track and field) at the 2015 Pan American Games
Athletes (track and field) at the 2019 Pan American Games
Pan American Games gold medalists for the British Virgin Islands
Pan American Games medalists in athletics (track and field)
World Athletics Championships athletes for British Virgin Islands
Female long jumpers
Central American and Caribbean Games gold medalists for the British Virgin Islands
Competitors at the 2014 Central American and Caribbean Games
Competitors at the 2018 Central American and Caribbean Games
Pan American Games gold medalists in athletics (track and field)
Central American and Caribbean Games medalists in athletics
Medalists at the 2019 Pan American Games
Athletes (track and field) at the 2020 Summer Olympics
Texas Longhorns athletes
Olympic athletes of the British Virgin Islands